Anthony Edsel Johannes van den Hurk (born 19 January 1993) is a professional footballer who plays as a forward for Ekstraklasa club Górnik Zabrze on loan from Çaykur Rizespor. He formerly played for Den Bosch, FC Eindhoven, De Graafschap, MVV Maastricht and Helsingborgs IF. Born in the Netherlands, he represents the Curaçao national football team.

International career
Van den Hurk debuted for the Curaçao national team in a 5–0 2022 FIFA World Cup qualification win over Saint Vincent and the Grenadines on 25 March 2021, scoring the second goal in the 17th minute.

On 6 June 2022, Van de Hurk scored his second international goal in a win against Honduras.

External links

References

1993 births
Living people
Footballers from North Brabant
People from Veghel
Curaçao footballers
Curaçao international footballers
Dutch footballers
Dutch people of Curaçao descent
Association football forwards
Blauw Geel '38 players
FC Den Bosch players
FC Eindhoven players
De Graafschap players
MVV Maastricht players
Helsingborgs IF players
Çaykur Rizespor footballers
Górnik Zabrze players
Eredivisie players
Eerste Divisie players
Allsvenskan players
TFF First League players

Dutch expatriate footballers
Curaçao expatriate footballers
Expatriate footballers in Sweden
Expatriate footballers in Turkey
Expatriate footballers in Poland
Dutch expatriate sportspeople in Sweden
Dutch expatriate sportspeople in Turkey
Dutch expatriate sportspeople in Poland
Curaçao expatriate sportspeople in Sweden
Curaçao expatriate sportspeople in Turkey
Curaçao expatriate sportspeople in Poland